Leonid Mikhaylovich Lobachov (Леонид Михайлович Лобачёв; born ) is a Belarusian male former weightlifter, who competed in the 76 kg category and represented Belarus at international competitions. He won the bronze medal in the snatch at the 1994 World Weightlifting Championships lifting 162.5 kg. He participated at the 1996 Summer Olympics.

References

External links
 

1966 births
Living people
Sportspeople from Gomel Region
Belarusian male weightlifters
World Weightlifting Championships medalists
Place of birth missing (living people)
Olympic weightlifters of Belarus
Weightlifters at the 1996 Summer Olympics